Aspergillus onikii is a species of fungus in the genus Aspergillus.

References

Further reading 
 
 
 

onikii